Dániel Kővágó (born 20 August 1990), sometimes known as Monstaz, is a Hungarian guitarist, producer and DJ.

In May 2013, Kővágó was the guitarist of ByeAlex during the Eurovision Song Contest 2013, performing the song "Kedvesem". The song ultimately placed tenth in the final with a score of 84 points.

References 

1990 births
Hungarian guitarists
Male guitarists
Hungarian record producers
Hungarian DJs
Living people
Musicians from Budapest
21st-century guitarists
Hungarian male musicians